Wolica  is a village in the administrative district of Gmina Łubnice, within Staszów County, Świętokrzyskie Voivodeship, in south-central Poland.

The village has a population of  255.

Demography 
According to the 2002 Poland census, there were 250 people residing in Wolica village, of whom 49.2% were male and 50.8% were female. In the village, the population was spread out, with 32.4% under the age of 18, 32.8% from 18 to 44, 17.6% from 45 to 64, and 17.2% who were 65 years of age or older.
 Figure 1. Population pyramid of village in 2002 — by age group and sex

References

Villages in Staszów County